El Momento Descuidado (a Spanish rendering of "The Unguarded Moment") is the eighteenth album by the Australian psychedelic rock band The Church, released in November 2004.

The album followed the outtakes compilation Beside Yourself by only a month. This time, the band decided to revisit past material in an all-acoustic setting, along with five new songs. For the first time in years, they performed "The Unguarded Moment" (albeit in strongly modified form), an early hit from which they had long distanced themselves. As a nod to the song's reappearance, they titled the album El Momento Descuidado - a rough Spanish translation of its name. A short all-acoustic tour followed the release in late 2004.

The album was nominated for an 2005 ARIA Music Award for Best Adult Contemporary album, but it lost to The Go-Betweens' Oceans Apart. James Christoper Monger at AllMusic praised the album's "intimacy and intensity", stating that "for musicians who have made a career out of dreamy, reverb-drenched landscapes ... that they've finally reduced these songs to the point of clarity is both triumphant and long overdue."

Track listing

Personnel 

Steve Kilbey – lead vocals, bass guitar, keyboards, guitar
Peter Koppes – guitars, keyboards, bass guitar, harmonica, vocals (8)
Tim Powles – drums, percussion, backing vocals
Marty Willson-Piper – guitars, bass guitar, vocals (6 & 11)

References

The Church (band) albums
2005 albums